Thomas Israel Banks (born April 19, 1949 in New York City) is a theoretical physicist and professor at Rutgers University and University of California, Santa Cruz.

Work
Banks' work centers around string theory and its applications to high energy particle physics and cosmology. He received his Ph.D. in Physics from the Massachusetts Institute of Technology in 1973. In 1973-86 he was appointed at the Tel Aviv University, he was several times a visiting scholar at the Institute for Advanced Study in Princeton (1976–78, 1983–84, and in the fall of 2010).

Along with Willy Fischler, Stephen Shenker, and Leonard Susskind, he is one of the four originators of M(atrix) theory, or BFSS Matrix Theory, an attempt to formulate M theory in a nonperturbative manner. Banks proposed a conjecture known as Asymptotic Darkness - it posits that the physics above the Planck scale is dominated by black hole production. He has often criticized the widely held assumption in the string theory community that background spacetimes with different asymptotics can represent different vacua states of the same theory of quantum gravity. Rather, Banks argues that different asymptotics correspond to different models of quantum gravity. Many of his arguments for this and other ideas are contained in his paper "A Critique of Pure String Theory: Heterodox Opinions of Diverse Dimensions." published in 2003.

Notes

External links 
Thomas Banks' profile at Scipp with list of publications
M Theory as a Matrix Model: A Conjecture
A Critique of Pure String Theory:  Heterodox Opinions of Diverse Dimensions
Tom Banks' Critique of Pure String Theory lecture during Strings 2002 at Cambridge University

21st-century American physicists
University of California, Santa Cruz faculty
Rutgers University faculty
American string theorists
Living people
1949 births
Institute for Advanced Study visiting scholars
Fellows of the American Academy of Arts and Sciences
MIT Department of Physics alumni
Fellows of the American Physical Society